Jade Marcus Buford (born February 15, 1988) is an American professional racing driver with experience in open-wheel, sports car, and stock car racing. He competes part-time in the NASCAR Xfinity Series, driving the No. 5 Chevrolet Camaro for Big Machine Racing.

Buford has also raced in the Pirelli World Challenge, British GT Championship, GT4 America Series, and ARCA Menards Series, NASCAR Craftsman Truck Series.

Racing career
Buford began his racing career when he was 18 years old, competing in Porsches; he was also an intern at the Porsche Driving School at Barber Motorsports Park. He debuted in Grand-Am's KONI Sports Car Challenge in 2009. He raced for RSR Motorsports in the ST class and shared the No. 196 Mini Cooper S with Owen Trinkler. In 2010, he joined Racers Edge Motorsports in the GS class of the renamed Continental Tire Sports Car Challenge.

He moved to Multimatic Motorsports in 2012, where he shared the No. 71 Aston Martin Vantage with Tonis Kasemets en route to an 11th-place GS finish. The following year, he partnered with Scott Maxwell in Multimatic's No. 55, during which Buford recorded a series-record seven pole positions. The two remained together for 2014. Buford's co-driver in 2015 was 16-year-old Austin Cindric, who described Buford as "someone to lean on" during the early stages of his racing career. The duo recorded a victory at Canadian Tire Motorsport Park.

Buford began competing in the Pirelli World Challenge's GTS class in 2016 with Racers Edge. He swept the Barber Motorsports Park weekend from the pole, followed by a third win at Lime Rock Park after wrecks took out the leaders and a cleanup truck interfered with another.

He ran two Sports Car Challenge races in 2017 with Multimatic. Buford also returned to the Pirelli World Challenge, running in the GTS Pro class with Racers Edge, and won both races at Mosport.

Buford joined PF Racing for the 2018 PWC season. In the GTS SprintX race at Circuit of the Americas, he scored the Mustang GT4's maiden victory when he and Maxwell passed pole sitter Harry Gottsacker during pit stops; Buford explained "some of the cars have outright pace on us, but we just executed the perfect race." Buford recorded a second win that year at Watkins Glen International after beating Ian James to the finish by .208 seconds.

In 2019, Buford ran the full Michelin Pilot Challenge schedule with PF Racing, finishing 11th in the standings. He also began racing in the British GT Championship's Silver Cup for Multimatic alongside fellow American Chad McCumbee.

For the 2020 MPC season, Buford shared PF's No. 40 with James Pesek and Shane Lewis. In June, he dabbled in stock car racing when he joined SS-Green Light Racing to drive their No. 07 NASCAR Xfinity Series car in the Pennzoil 150 at the Indianapolis Motor Speedway road course. After starting 17th, Buford finished 14th in the event. Buford would make his second NASCAR start at Road America in the No. 6 for JD Motorsports, replacing the car's usual driver, B. J. McLeod.

In 2021, Buford joined the newly-formed Big Machine Racing for the full Xfinity season. His first race with the team came in the second round on the Daytona road course as he was not approved for the season opener on the oval.

Personal life
Buford is a graduate of Auburn University. An avid rock climber, he participated in the show American Ninja Warrior in 2017 (Daytona Beach) and 2018 (Philadelphia), but was eliminated on the third obstacle in both attempts.

Motorsports career results

NASCAR
(key) (Bold – Pole position awarded by qualifying time. Italics – Pole position earned by points standings or practice time. * – Most laps led.)

Xfinity Series

Camping World Truck Series

 Season still in progress

ARCA Menards Series
(key) (Bold – Pole position awarded by qualifying time. Italics – Pole position earned by points standings or practice time. * – Most laps led.)

ARCA Menards Series East

References

External links
 

Living people
1988 births
24 Hours of Daytona drivers
American Ninja Warrior contestants
Auburn University alumni
British GT Championship drivers
NASCAR drivers
Rolex Sports Car Series drivers
People from Brentwood, Tennessee
Racing drivers from Tennessee
Multimatic Motorsports drivers